Tatarbunary is a city in the Bilhorod-Dnistrovskyi Raion, Odesa Oblast (province) of south-western Ukraine. Administrative center of the Tatarbunary municipality. Population: 

The word "Tatarbunary" means "Tatar Wells" in South Slavic languages, with "bunar" borrowed from Turkic "pınar", "well". The name Tatarbunar is mentioned by Dimitrie Cantemir in his work Descriptio Moldaviae (1714–1716).

History
The settlement appears to have been founded in the 16th century, when the Principality of Moldavia, became dependent of the Ottoman Empire. Later it was annexed by the Russian Empire in 1812 along with Bessarabia (eastern half of the Principality of Moldavia). In the wake of the Russian Revolution, the region was claimed by the Moldavian Democratic Republic, the Ukrainian People's Republic and the Odesa Soviet Republic. Ultimately occupied by Romanian troops in mid February 1918, it formally became part of the Kingdom of Romania in March, after a regional council in Chişinău proclaimed the whole of Bessarabia united with the latter. During 1924, the settlement was the site of a peasants' revolt known as the Tatarbunary Uprising.

In 1940, following Soviet Ultimatum the city and the Budzhak region was transferred to the USSR and incorporated into Ukrainian SSR as Akkerman Oblast. In 1941–44 it was occupied by Romania following Axis attack on the Soviet Union.
During World War II, an Einsatzgruppen massacred the local Jewish population in a mass execution.

In 1978, Tatarbunary obtained city status. It now produces wine and woollen cloth.

Environmental issues
An assessment in August 2007 highlighted several problems.

Drinking water
The central water supply serves 60% of the population, drawing water from a depth of 120 metres. The water tastes salty, and the limited capacity means that water is available for only four hours per day. The other 40% of the population use private wells, but the water is dirty and unsuitable for drinking. Many people harvest rainwater, but this is considered unsuitable for drinking and is used for irrigation and washing. People have no choice but to drink processed water from water tanks.

Sanitation
Some sewage flows untreated into Sasyk Lagoon, others use pit latrines which present a problem because of regular flooding.

Pollution
The Sasyk Lagoon has become too dangerous for swimming because of pollution, including pesticides and heavy metals. The water is described as greenish with an unpleasant smell.

This follows a Soviet project in the late 1970s, when a dam was built separating Sasyk Lagoon from the Black Sea with the idea of converting the lagoon to a fresh water lake to use for irrigation. However, this failed and the use of water from Sasyk resulted in the salinization of about 30,000 hectares of land, with associated impact on crops, and mineralization of ground water and wells.

Many now favour breaking the dam and reconnecting the lagoon with the sea.

Health
The rates of cancer in this region are among the highest in Ukraine, especially among children and young adults.

Photographs

References

Cities in Odesa Oblast
Populated places in Bessarabia
Akkermansky Uyezd
Holocaust locations in Ukraine
Bilhorod-Dnistrovskyi Raion